The Ghost in the Machine Tour was a concert tour by The Police to promote their album Ghost in the Machine. To reflect the horns-based sound that permeated the album, the band decided to work with back-up musicians, hiring a horn section called The Chops (Darryl Dixon, David Watson and Marvin Daniels), who previously worked on the Sugarhill label.
 
The opening act for the North America II portion was Bow Wow Wow or Oingo Boingo or the Go-Go's and Joan Jett and the Blackhearts for the North America III portion (Portland, Maine) opening act was Black Uhuru. The English Beat was the opening act for the North America IV portion of the tour. A Flock of Seagulls opened for The Police in Norfolk, Virginia. Jools Holland and his Millionaires opened for the Police during the UK dates of the tour.

The Toronto appearance on 13 August 1982 was the second annual "Police Picnic" festival, with the band headlining. Opening acts included Oingo Boingo, The Spoons, A Flock of Seagulls, the English Beat, Joan Jett and the Blackhearts, and Talking Heads. During the Police set, Ranking Roger of the English Beat joined them on "One World (Not Three)".

Setlist
This setlist was obtained from the 20 March 1982 concert; held at The Summit in Houston, Texas. It does not represent all concerts for the duration of the tour. 
"Voices Inside My Head" 
"Message in a Bottle"
"Every Little Thing She Does Is Magic"
"Spirits in the Material World"
"Hungry for You (J'aurais toujours faim de toi)" 
"When the World Is Running Down, You Make the Best of What's Still Around" 
"The Bed's Too Big Without You"
"De Do Do Do, De Da Da Da"
"Demolition Man"
"Shadows in the Rain"
"Walking on the Moon"
"Invisible Sun"
"Bring on the Night"
"One World (Not Three)" 
"Roxanne"
"Don't Stand So Close to Me"
"Can't Stand Losing You" / "Reggatta De Blanc" / "Be My Girl—Sally"
"So Lonely"

Personnel
Sting – bass, doublebass, synthesizer, lead vocals
Andy Summers – guitar, synthesizer, backing vocals
Stewart Copeland – drums, percussion, backing vocals
Darryl Dixon – baritone sax
David Watson – alto sax
Marvin Daniels – trumpet
Bono – vocals on "Invisible Sun" (British leg of the tour)

Tour dates

References

Sources
 The Police – Ghost In The Machine Tour – 1981 / 1982

1981 concert tours
The Police concert tours
1982 concert tours